Djamolidine Mirgarifanovich Abdoujaparov (born 28 February 1964) is a former professional road racing cyclist from Uzbekistan. Abdoujaparov was a sprinter, nicknamed "The Tashkent Terror" as he was so ferocious in the sprints. His unorthodox and often erratic sprinting caused a number of crashes. He competed in the individual road race at the Olympic Games on two occasions: in 1988 for the Soviet Union and in 1996 for Uzbekistan; he placed fifth in 1988.

Career
Abdoujaparov was born in Tashkent to a Crimean Tatar family which was forcibly deported to Uzbekistan during Soviet rule. A graduate of the Soviet sports programme, he came into his prime just as his country gained independence; after initial difficulties (including Uzbekistan's not being affiliated to the UCI, which caused problems with the Cycling World Championship) he signed for a Western professional team and became one of the world's top sprinters.

Abdoujaparov had numerous tussles with Laurent Jalabert in the Tour de France's green sprinters jersey competition in the early 1990s. In 1991 Abdoujaparov won the competition despite a spectacular crash during the final stage on the Champs-Élysées in Paris, where he collided with the barriers 100 m before the finish and somersaulted into the air. Despite still holding enough points to win the sprinters' jersey, he had to cross the line unaided. Members of his team picked him up, put him back on the bike, and he rode slowly over the last few meters, medical staff walking alongside him.

In his last complete tour in 1996, Abdoujaparov achieved a mountain breakaway for his last stage win, unusual for a sprinter. By this stage, though, results were not as good, and after failing seven separate anti-doping tests during the 1997 season, including twice at the 1997 Tour de France, he retired from cycling. He failed the tests screening for the presence in his body of, among others, the anti-asthma drug clenbuterol.

Abdoujaparov, a British rock band formed by former Carter USM guitarist Les "Fruitbat" Carter, is named after him.

Major results

1985 
 Tour de l'Avenir
1st  Points classification
1st Stage 6b
 Giro Ciclistico d'Italia
1st Stages 4, 6 & 9
 Circuit de la Sarthe-Pays de la Loire
1st Stages 4a & 4b
1987
 Peace Race
1st Stages 7, 11 & 14
 3rd Gran Premio Palio del Recioto
1988
 Peace Race
1st  Points classification
1st Stages 1 & 12
 Tour de Pologne
1st Stages 2, 6 & 7
 5th Road race, Olympic Games
1989
 1st Stage 1 Peace Race
 3rd Gran Premio della Liberazione
1990 
 8th Coppa Bernocchi
1991
 1st Gent–Wevelgem
 1st Giro del Piemonte
 Tour de France
1st  Points classification
1st Stages 1 & 4
 1st Stage 7 Volta a Catalunya
 1st Stage 1 Settimana Internazionale di Coppi e Bartali
 Vuelta a Murcia
1st Stages 2 & 4b
 4th Milan–San Remo
1992
 Vuelta a España
1st  Points classification
1st Stages 2a, 4, 11 & 21
 Volta a la Comunitat Valenciana
1st Stages 5a & 6
 1st Stage 3 Tour of Britain
1993
 Tour de France
1st  Points classification
1st Stages 3, 18 & 20
 Vuelta a España
1st Stages 9, 12 & 20
 1st Stage 10 Tour de Suisse
 3rd Gent–Wevelgem
 4th Overall Three Days of De Panne
1994
 1st Memorial Rik Van Steenbergen
 1st Polynormande
 Tour de France
1st  Points classification
1st Stages 1 & 20
 Giro d'Italia
1st  Points classification
1st  Intergiro classification
1st Stage 10
 Paris–Nice
1st Stages 3 & 8a
 1st Stage 10 Tour DuPont
 2nd Overall Three Days of De Panne
1st Stages 1 & 3a
 2nd Overall Ronde van Nederland
1st Stages 2 & 4
 2nd Classic Haribo
 3rd Scheldeprijs
 5th Gent–Wevelgem
1995
 1st Stage 20 Tour de France
 1st Stage 3 Tour DuPont
 5th Scheldeprijs
 10th Memorial Rik Van Steenbergen
1996
 1st Stage 14 Tour de France
 1st Stage 2 Tirreno–Adriatico
 1st Stage 1 Vuelta a Murcia
 1st Stage 2 Giro di Sardegna
 3rd Gran Premio Industria e Commercio di Prato
1997
 1st La Côte Picarde
 1st Stage 7 Four Days of Dunkirk
Critérium du Dauphiné Liberé
1st Stages 1 & 3

See also
List of sportspeople sanctioned for doping offences
List of doping cases in cycling

References

1964 births
Living people
Uzbekistani male cyclists
Soviet male cyclists
Doping cases in cycling
Uzbekistani Tour de France stage winners
Sportspeople from Tashkent
Uzbekistani people of Crimean Tatar descent
Crimean Tatar sportspeople
Tour de France Champs Elysées stage winners
Uzbekistani Giro d'Italia stage winners
Uzbekistani Vuelta a España stage winners
Uzbekistani sportspeople in doping cases
Cyclists at the 1988 Summer Olympics
Cyclists at the 1996 Summer Olympics
Olympic cyclists of the Soviet Union
Olympic cyclists of Uzbekistan
Tour de Suisse stage winners